A chess opening theory table or ECO table (Encyclopaedia of Chess Openings) presents lines of moves, typically (but not always) from the starting position.  Notated chess moves are presented in the table from left to right. Variations on a given line are given horizontally below the parent line.

Arrangement 

Chess opening theory tables are commonly published in opening books with annotations by experienced chess players. These tables are typically arranged in a compact manner to allow experienced players to see variations from a position quickly. Usually, the table indicates that either White or Black has equal, slightly better, or better chances at the end of the variation. Often, this information is distilled down to mere symbols ("Σ" for example) or the percentage of games (usually tournament games) where White won – no information is usually given on what the assessment is based on or how to proceed in the game.

Shortcomings 

Chess opening theory books that provide these tables are usually quite large and difficult for beginners to use. Because the table entries typically do not include the themes or goals involved in a given line, beginners will either try to memorize the tables or simply drown in the detail. The Wikibook Chess Opening Theory aims to bridge this gap by providing this type of information at the end of each line.

Notation 

Typically, each table has a heading indicating the moves required to reach the position for which the table provides an analysis. The example below is for the opening position, so no moves are shown in the heading. The first row provides the move numbers with subsequent rows representing different variations. Since the initial position is not always the opening position, these numbers will not always start at "1." White half-moves are shown above black half-moves. Ellipses (...) represent moves that, for the variation, are identical to the variation above. Bold type indicates that another variation is considered elsewhere – usually in another table.  A hyphen (-) or en dash (–) indicates that the variation transposes to a variation elsewhere. Transpositions are common in chess – a given position can often be reached by different move orders – even move orders with more or fewer moves. The table may also provide percentage of games won by white for each variation, based on the results of the games considered in creating the table.

Development

Chess openings are studied in great depth by serious players. "Novelties", or new, previously unexplored variations are often discovered and played by professional players.  These new lines can refute lines that were previously thought to be sound. The games that represent this discovery process are represented in these ever-changing and expanding tables. With the advent of computer databases, even the most casual player can explore an opening line deeply, looking for novelties to spring on their opponents.

Example

External sources of chess opening theory tables 

 John Nunn (editor), Graham Burgess, John Emms, Joe Gallagher (1999), Nunn's Chess Openings. .
 Nick de Firmian, Walter Korn (1999), Modern Chess Openings: MCO-14. .
 Aleksandar Matanović (editor), Encyclopaedia of Chess Openings, 5 volumes (Belgrade: Šahovski informator)

Chess opening theory table